Herit Mungai Atariza is a left-back currently in the books of Kenyan Premier League side Nairobi City Stars.

Career

Mungai turned out for second-tier side FC Talanta in 2017 for a year before making a big move to Kenyan Premier League side F.C. Kariobangi Sharks at the start of the 2018 season. 

He then moved to Posta Rangers F.C. in 2019 for a short stint. He was to return to the second tier to join Coast Stars F.C. In 2020 he returned to the topflight by joining Nairobi City Stars.

References

External links
 

2000 births
Living people
Kenyan footballers
Kenyan Premier League players
Posta Rangers F.C. players
F.C. Kariobangi Sharks players
Coast Stars F.C. players
Nairobi City Stars players